Alfred Zeisler (September 26, 1892 – March 1, 1985) was an American-born German film producer, director, actor and screenwriter. He produced 29 films between 1927 and 1936. He also directed 16 films between 1924 and 1949.

Selected filmography

Rivals (1923)
 The Last Battle (1923)
 Docks of Hamburg (1928)
 Guilty (1928)
 Sajenko the Soviet (1928)
 Under Suspicion (1928)
 The League of Three (1929)
 High Treason (1929)
 The Smuggler's Bride of Mallorca (1929)
 Scandal in Baden-Baden (1929)
 The Tiger Murder Case (1930)
 Express 13 (1931)
 A Shot at Dawn (1932)
 Spoiling the Game (1932)
 The Country Schoolmaster (1933)
 The Star of Valencia (1933 – director)
 Viktor und Viktoria (1933)
 A Door Opens (1933)
 George and Georgette (1934)
 Gold (1934)
 Love and the First Railway (1934)
 Holiday From Myself (1934)
 The Young Count (1935)
 Punks Arrives from America (1935)
 Crime Over London (1936)
 The Amazing Quest of Ernest Bliss  (1936 – director)
 Make-Up (1937)
 Fear (1946 – director)
 Parole, Inc. (1948 – director)
 Alimony (1949 – director)

References

External links

1892 births
1985 deaths
Film producers from Illinois
American male screenwriters
American male film actors
Male actors from Chicago
German-language film directors
Film directors from Illinois
20th-century American male actors
Screenwriters from Illinois
People from Camano, Washington
20th-century American male writers
20th-century American screenwriters